MITR is a multilateral interbank network sharing arrangement of 6 member Banks in India for automated teller machines (ATMs). It came into existence on 8 October 2003 with five member banks.

The MITR network has six member banks:
 Punjab National Bank (PNB) 
 Oriental Bank of Commerce (OBC)
 Indian Bank 
 Karur Vysya Bank 
 IndusInd Bank
 UCO Bank

PNB acts as settlement bank for MITR Network. ATM transaction switching technology has been provided by Chennai-based Financial Software Solutions (P) Ltd.

Competitors
 Cashnet
 CashTree
 BANCS

References 

Interbank networks in India
Banking in India